In 2022–23 season, USM Khenchela are competing in the Ligue 1 for the 3rd season and the Algerian Cup.

Squad list
Players and squad numbers last updated on 5 February 2023.Note: Flags indicate national team as has been defined under FIFA eligibility rules. Players may hold more than one non-FIFA nationality.

Competitions

Overview

{| class="wikitable" style="text-align: center"
|-
!rowspan=2|Competition
!colspan=8|Record
!rowspan=2|Started round
!rowspan=2|Final position / round
!rowspan=2|First match	
!rowspan=2|Last match
|-
!
!
!
!
!
!
!
!
|-
| Ligue 1

|  
| To be confirmed
| 27 August 2022
| In Progress
|-
| Algerian Cup

| Round of 64 
| To be confirmed
| 20 December 2022
| In Progress
|-
! Total

Ligue 1

League table

Results summary

Results by round

Matches
The league fixtures were announced on 19 July 2022.

Algerian Cup

Squad information

Playing statistics

|-
! colspan=10 style=background:#dcdcdc; text-align:center| Goalkeepers

|-
! colspan=10 style=background:#dcdcdc; text-align:center| Defenders

|-
! colspan=10 style=background:#dcdcdc; text-align:center| Midfielders

|-
! colspan=10 style=background:#dcdcdc; text-align:center| Forwards

|-
! colspan=10 style=background:#dcdcdc; text-align:center| Players transferred out during the season

Goalscorers

Includes all competitive matches. The list is sorted alphabetically by surname when total goals are equal.

Transfers

Summer

In

Winter

Out

Winter

References

Algerian football clubs 2022–23 season